Axel Norén (born 4 April 1999) is a Swedish football defender who plays for GAIS.

References

1999 births
Living people
Swedish footballers
Association football defenders
Mjällby AIF players
Gefle IF players
Falkenbergs FF players
GAIS players
Ettan Fotboll players
Allsvenskan players